The EPPY Awards are a premier accolade for media-affiliated websites, presented by Editor & Publisher magazine. Designed in 1996 to honor newspaper companies that did an "outstanding job in creating online services," the awards were originally given in partnership between Mediaweek and Editor & Publisher and named the Best Online Newspaper Services Competition, and presented at the end of the Interactive Newspaper Conference.  

In 1998, the awards were renamed the EPPY Awards. and in 2003 the awards were expanded to recognize websites associated with other media outlets, as well as newspapers. Today the EPPY Awards honor the best in digital news publishing across more than 45 diverse categories, including excellence in college/university digital journalism. 

From 2003 to 2009, Mediaweek co-sponsored the (renamed) Interactive Media Conference & Trade Show, and both the awards and conference were moved from February to May. Beginning in 2011, the EPPY Awards moved online and is now totally run and owned by Editor & Publisher Magazine. 

The latest 2022 EPPY Awards winners included Best Daily Newspaper Website (1 million or more unique visitors), The Boston Globe for BostonGlobe.com. Best Black Newspaper Website (fewer than 1 million unique visitors), Defender Network for DefenderNetwork.com. Best Sports News Website (1 million or more unique visitors), ESPN Digital Media. Best Business/Finance Website (1 million or more unique visitors), CNBC for CNBC.com and Best Collaborative Investigative/ Enterprise Reporting (1 million or more unique visitors), Bloomberg Businessweek and Bloomberg Green for “The Methane Menace.”

Award categories 
As of 2022, the EPPY Awards are awarded across 47 diverse media-related categories, with two tiers based on readership size (over or under 1 million unique monthly visitors).

Website Categories

 Best daily newspaper website
 Best weekly or non-daily newspaper website
 Best Black newspaper website
 Best Hispanic newspaper website
 Best Asian newspaper website 
 Best magazine website
 Best sports news website
 Best sports news website
 Best online-only news website
 Best local TV news website
 Best local radio news website 
 Best business/finance website
 Best entertainment / cultural news website
 Best mobile news app 

Content Categories

 Best investigative/enterprise feature
 Best collaborative investigative/enterprise reporting
 Best news or event feature 
 Best business reporting 
 Best business/finance blog 
 Best news/political blog
 Best use of data/infographics
 Best use of social media/crowd sourcing
 Best innovation project on a website
 Best community service project/reporting
 Best news or event feature video
 Best investigative/enterprise video
 Best investigative/enterprise video
 Best sports video 
 Best podcast
 Best photojournalism on a website
 Best editorial/political cartoon 
 Best incorporation of sponsored/branded content 
 Best overall website design
 Best home page design
 Best redesign/relaunch
 Best website navigation design
 Best cause marketing/corporate social responsibility campaign
 Best promotional/marketing campaign

College Categories

 Best college/university campus website
 Best college/university-produced community or Niche Website
 Best collaborative college/university & professional website
 Best news story on a college/university website
 Best feature story on a college/university website
 Best video on a college/university website
 Best photojournalism on a college/university website
 Best college/university investigative/documentary
 Best college/university sports section/website

Dates and locations

References

Web awards
History of the Internet